Traditionally, the buildings of Amman, Jordan had a unified human scale that primarily consisted of cubic buildings ranging from one to four stories in height.  This scale is being greatly compromised as a result of the advent of the high-rise buildings.

The city is currently experiencing rapid growth that is reshaping the ancient city into a commercial hub. New projects and proposals in and around the city include: the Abdali Project and the construction of the Jordan Gate Towers near the 6th Circle, which is put on hold.

Panoramic view

Tallest buildings in Amman
The following is a list of the tallest buildings in Amman:

Tallest proposed buildings

See also

 Abdali Project
 Jordan Gate Towers

References

Tallest
Architecture in Jordan
Tallest